Andrey Anatolievich Alekseyenko (born April 23, 1978, in Novopokrovskaya, Krasnodar Krai) is a Russian politician and economist who served as mayor of Krasnodar from 2021 to 2022. From August 19 to early September 2022, he served as the head of government of the Russian occupation of Kharkiv Oblast.

Early life
Alekseyenko is from Kuban. He studied engineering and economics at Kuban State Agrarian University in Krasnodar, and later obtained a degree of Candidate of Sciences in economics. Starting in 1996, he worked in a construction company, rising from being a foreman to the position of technical supervision engineer. He became the director of the volleyball federation of Krasnodar Krai.

Political career

Krasnodar Krai politics 

He joined the political party United Russia. From 2007 to 2010, he ran Krasnodar Krai's department for economic affairs and international relations. In 2010, he became head of the administration of Tuapse. In September 2015, he briefly took a similar position in Yeysk. In September 2017, he became Deputy Governor of Krasnodar Krai, where he was responsible in part for municipal infrastructure, investment, and local government property. On October 21, 2021, he became interim mayor of Krasnodar, and was officially appointed to the position on November 17 of the same year. In December 2021, he was charged with accepting a large bribe in the form of a very expensive gun worth 1.6 million rubles three years earlier.

He was awarded a medal for his contributions to the development of Krasnodar Krai.

Activities in Russian-occupied Ukraine 

In 2022, he supported the Russian invasion of Ukraine, helping recruit soldiers and visiting the occupied territories several times. On August 18, 2022, he resigned as mayor of Krasnodar. The next day, he was appointed as the deputy head of the Kharkiv military-civilian administration, initially based in Kupiansk. Around September 8, the administration was moved to Vovchansk due to the 2022 Kharkiv counteroffensive, and two days later on the 10th, the Russian officials also left that city as well.

On November 25, 2022, he was appointed Prime Minister of the Russian-occupied parts of the Kherson Oblast, where he deals with integrating the institutions of the occupied region into the legal, economic, and social system of the Russian Federation. On December 12, he received the Order of Courage from the Russian government "for courage and dedication shown in rescuing people in an emergency" and "for courageous and decisive actions performed in the line of duty."

Personal life 

He is married, and has three children.

References 

1978 births
People of the 2022 Russian invasion of Ukraine
Russian civil servants
Russian engineers
Russian economists
Russian sports executives and administrators
United Russia politicians
People from Krasnodar
Alumni by university or college in Russia
Living people